Pyropteron leucomelaena is a moth of the family Sesiidae. It is found in France, Spain, Portugal, Italy, the Balkan Peninsula and Ukraine. It is also found in North Africa and from Asia Minor to Armenia.

The larvae feed on Sanguisorba minor.

References

Moths described in 1847
Sesiidae
Moths of Europe
Moths of Asia